The Osun State Executive Council (also known as, the Cabinet of Osun State) is the highest formal governmental body that plays important roles in the Government of Osun State headed by the Governor of Osun State. It consists of the Deputy Governor, Secretary to the State Government, Chief of Staff, Commissioners who preside over ministerial departments, and the Governor's special aides.

Functions
The Executive Council exists to advise and direct the Governor. Their appointment as members of the Executive Council gives them the authority to execute power over their fields.

Current cabinet
The current Executive Council  is serving under the Gboyega Oyetola administration which was inaugurated as the 9th Governor of Osun State on November 27, 2018.

References

Osun
Osun State